Peter Richard Olsen (31 October 1911 – 13 February 1956) was a Danish rower who competed in the 1936 Summer Olympics.

In 1936 he won the silver medal with his partner Harry Larsen in the coxless pairs competition.

References

External links
 profile

1911 births
1956 deaths
Danish male rowers
Olympic rowers of Denmark
Rowers at the 1936 Summer Olympics
Olympic silver medalists for Denmark
Olympic medalists in rowing
Medalists at the 1936 Summer Olympics
European Rowing Championships medalists